A Limousine the Colour of Midsummer's Eve is a 1981 Latvian TV-film, a comedy directed by Jānis Streičs. Movie was produced by Riga Film Studio. The film was awarded the Latvian National Film Prize Lielais Kristaps in 1981. The film is included into Latvian Culture Canon, and voted all-time best Latvian film in popular vote. It is shown every year on TV prior to the summer solstice festival of Jāņi, which is a national holiday in Latvia. The movie is about  the struggle of two related families for the eighty-year-old aunt's inheritance through comic and romantic events.

Plot 
The movie begins when old auntie Mirta (Mirta Saknīte) succeeds in a lottery and wins a car which every Soviet citizen longs for – a Zhiguli car. Because of her old age, she cannot use the car herself. And when the word spreads out about her luck, different family members all of a sudden come to her countryside house to 'be helpful' in favour to get the car after aunt's death. Mirta's nephew Ēriks with his wife Dagnija and their son Uģis decided to give up their holiday to Carpathian Mountains just to lay their hands on aunties' legacy. Not only Mirta's nephew decided to surprise her with his arrival but her ex-daughter-in-law Olita together with her new family including her new husband Viktors and their offspring Lāsma.

The funny rivalry between two sides of the family, foolish jealousy of the near living peasants' family, who had always non-selfishly been there for auntie Mirta, is a caricature of greasy human nature. This is a slight humor of the Soviet life details as well. But aunt Mirta isn't a fool, she is still young in her heart until her very last breath, which also can be seen in her last will - to whom she left her car to, a Limousine The Colour Of Midsummer's Eve.

Family members
Aunt Mirta (Mirta Saknīte) — Lilita Bērziņa

Tūteri family 
Dagnija — Olga Dreģe
Ēriks — Uldis Dumpis
Uģis — Gundars Āboliņš

Sprēsliņi family 
Olita — Baiba Indriksone
Viktors — Boļeslavs Ružs
Lāsma — Diāna Zande

Awards 
A Limousine the Colour of Midsummer's Eve in 1981 was named as the best full-length movie that year by Latvian National Movie Festival "Lielais Kristaps".

The movie was also included into Latvian Culture Canon.

Reconstruction 
In 2008, the movie was restored from what it originally looked like. All the technical failures that occurred during the filming were improved, including the soundtrack of the film and colours were added where necessary. Also, more detailed information about the main heroine of the movie (Lilita Bērziņa) was included into the DVD.

Cast 
 Lilita Bērziņa ..... Aunt Mirta
 Olga Dreģe ..... Dagnija Tūtere
 Uldis Dumpis ..... Ēriks Tūters
 Gundars Āboliņš ..... Uģis Tūters
 Romualds Ancāns ..... Jāzeps Gilučs
 Baiba Indriksone ..... Olita Sprēsliņa
 Boļeslavs Ružs ..... Viktors Sprēsliņš
 Diāna Zande ..... Lāsma Sprēsliņa
 Ēvalds Valters ..... Pigalu Prīdis
 Līga Liepiņa ..... Veronika Giluča

References

External links
 

Latvian comedy films
Soviet comedy films
1981 films
Soviet-era Latvian films
Riga Film Studio films